Deerfield Township, Illinois may refer to:

 Deerfield Township, Fulton County, Illinois
 Deerfield Township, Lake County, Illinois, the former name of Moraine Township, changed in 1998

See also 
 West Deerfield Township, Lake County, Illinois
 Deerfield Township (disambiguation)

Illinois township disambiguation pages